Cerro El Cóndor is a stratovolcano in Argentina.

Cerro El Cóndor is a remote peak in the Argentine Puna de Atacama. The volcano has the form of a massif (which covers a surface of ) constructed by two separate volcanoes; the older edifice forms parts of the northern and eastern flanks which are cut by scarps interpreted as caldera remnants.

Surrounding volcanoes include Condorito (which is considered to be part of the old El Cóndor volcano), Falso Azufre and Laguna Escondida which have constrained the extent of El Cóndor's lava flows. The volcano rises within the Laguna Amarga caldera, and an older mafic monogenetic volcano lies north of El Cóndor.

Radiometric dating has yielded ages of 2.89 - 2.67 million years ago to 0.13 - 0.02 million years ago, with the volcano developing in two phases. The older group of ages has been obtained on the Condorito and the older edifice, while the ages of 130,000 years ago and younger come from the younger edifice and lava flows; some of these dates have high uncertainties (one young age is 20,000 ± 30,000 years ago from the western flank) and Holocene eruptions in the summit region are possible. Presently, Cóndor is considered to be a dormant volcano with the potential of future activity, and while the remoteness of the volcano reduces any hazard potential future pyroclastic eruptions could impact air traffic over the region and east of it.

Cerro El Cóndor is part of the Central Volcanic Zone of the Andes together with about 110 other Quaternary volcanoes, and lies in the southern sector of the volcanic zone; other volcanic zones in the Andes are the Northern Volcanic Zone, the Southern Volcanic Zone and the Austral Volcanic Zone. The history of volcanic activity is poorly known for most of these volcanoes owing to the lack of dating; only a few historical eruptions have been recorded, such as an eruption at Ojos del Salado in 1993.

The volcano has erupted trachyandesite and trachydacite in the later stages of activity, after a stage with andesitic to dacitic eruptions. The rocks define a potassium-rich calc-alkaline suite.

See also
 List of volcanoes in Argentina
 List of mountains in Argentina
 List of mountains in the Andes
 List of Ultras of South America

References

Sources

External links
 "El Cóndor, Argentina" on Peakbagger

Stratovolcanoes of Argentina
Subduction volcanoes
Mountains of Argentina
Polygenetic volcanoes
Six-thousanders of the Andes
Pliocene stratovolcanoes
Pleistocene stratovolcanoes